The Star City Confederate Memorial is located at the southwest corner of the town square of Star City, Arkansas. The marble monument depicts a Confederate Army soldier standing in mid stride with his left foot forward. His hands hold the barrel of a rifle, whose butt rests on the monument base. The monument was erected in 1926 by a local chapter of the United Daughters of the Confederacy at a cost of about $2,500.

The memorial was first placed on the grounds of the 1911 courthouse, which was made into the town square after that building was torn down in 1943.  That year, the memorial was moved to the grounds of the new courthouse.  In the 1990s it was moved back to the town square, and now stands near its original location.

All four sides of the monument base have inscriptions.  The front, facing south, reads "IN MEMORY OF / OUR / CONFEDERATE / HEROES / 1861 - 1865".  The east side reads "LINCOLN COUNTY / REMEMBERS THE / FAITHFULNESS OF / HER SONS AND / COMMENDS THEIR / EXAMPLE TO / FUTURE GENERATIONS."  The north side reads "ERECTED BY / CAPT. J. MARTIN / MERONEY / CHAPTER NO. 1831 / OF LINCOLN COUNTY / U. D. C."  The west side reads "OUR FURLED BANNER / WREATHED WITH / GLORY AND THOUGH / CONQUERED, WE ADORE / IT. WEEP FOR THOSE / WHO FELL BEFORE IT. / PARDON THOSE WHO / TRAILED AND TORE IT."

The monument was listed on the National Register of Historic Places in 1996.

See also
National Register of Historic Places listings in Lincoln County, Arkansas

References

1926 establishments in Arkansas
1926 sculptures
Individually listed contributing properties to historic districts on the National Register in Arkansas
Monuments and memorials on the National Register of Historic Places in Arkansas
National Register of Historic Places in Lincoln County, Arkansas
United Daughters of the Confederacy monuments and memorials in Arkansas
Star City, Arkansas
Relocated buildings and structures in Arkansas